Nõmme Mire Nature Reserve is a nature reserve which is located in Järva County, Estonia.

The area of the nature reserve is 437 ha.

The protected area was founded in 2006 to protect valuable habitat types and threatened species in Kärevere, Pibari, Tännassilma, and Villevere villages (all in Türi Parish).

References

Nature reserves in Estonia
Geography of Järva County